The Flower Fields is a flower garden in Carlsbad Ranch in Carlsbad, California. It is open to visitors between March 1st and Mother's Day.  

The Flower Fields' attractions include its "Tecolote Giant Ranunculus", a greenhouse filled with cymbidium orchids, a 300-by-170-foot American flag made out of red, white, and blue petunias, as well as the Field's "sweet pea maze." The Fields offer Antique Tractor-Wagon rides with tractor-wagons provided by the Antique Gas and Steam Engine Museum of Vista, California. The Flower Fields also hosts a variety of musical and themed events. Past events have included Kid's Day, Bluegrass Day and Zydeco Day. 

More than 180 volunteers, led by Carlsbad resident Joni Miringoff, lead educational tours of the Fields for both adults and children. In 2015, it was anticipated that there would be more than 7,000 school children visiting the fields on these educational tours. 

The fields receive 100,000 and 200,000 visitors each year. The fields have been covered by outlets such as CBS News Los Angeles, NBC News 4 Southern California, and The Huffington Post Travel. In 2012, CBS listed it as one of the best places to see Southern California wildflowers.

History 

In 2012, the color variants of the flowers were changed for the first time since 1997. The land under the Flower Fields has been used for the a variety of different purposes, including amusement parks, shopping malls, and resorts. However, in 2015, the Flower Fields gained official protection from further development.

In 2015, The Flower Fields increased the cost of admission by one dollar in order to compensate for increased expenditure due to severe drought.

External links 
 The Flower Fields' Official Website

References 

Gardens in California